The first season of the Russian reality talent show The Voice Senior (The Voice. 60+) premiered on September 14, 2018 on Channel One. Leonid Agutin, Pelageya, and Valery Meladze became the first confirmed coaches on August 13, 2018, followed by Lev Leshchenko on August 14. Dmitry Nagiev appeared as the show's presenter. Lidia Muzaleva was announced the winner on October 5, 2018, marking Pelageya's first win as a coach and the first female coach to win in the show's history.

Coaches and presenter

Pelageya, Leonid Agutin, and Valery Meladze became the first confirmed coaches on August 13, 2018, followed by Lev Leshchenko on August 14, 2018.

Dmitry Nagiev appeared as a presenter.

Teams
Colour key

Blind auditions
A new feature this season is The Best coach of the season (also in each episode).
Colour key

The coaches performed "Жизнь" at the start of the show.

The Knockouts
The Knockouts round aired on September 28, 2018. This stage was pre-recorded at Mosfilm on September 11, 2018.

The top 8 contestants then moved on to the "Live Season Final."

Colour key

Final
Colour key

Best Coach
Colour key

Reception

Rating

Notes

References

2018 Russian television seasons